= List of honorary citizens of San Marino =

Honorary citizens of San Marino

People awarded the Honorary citizenship of the Republic of San Marino are:

== Honorary Citizens of San Marino ==
Listed by date of award:

Date	Image	Name	Notes
7 May 1861		Abraham Lincoln (12 February 1809–15 April 1865)	American Politician and 16th President of the United States (1861-1865).
